Hördt is a municipality in the district of Germersheim, in Rhineland-Palatinate, Germany.

Personalities 

Jakob Baumann (1862-1922), cathedral vicar in Speyer, author, long-standing editor of the diocese newspaper "Der Pilger"
 Franz Hamburger (born 1946), social pedagogue

Personalities who have worked on the ground
 Andreas Helmling (born 1959), sculptor, created the "Stifterskulptur" on the roundabout in 2005.

References

Germersheim (district)